Kristina Bader (born 10 November 1981) is a Soviet-born German bobsledder who competed from 2001 to 2004. She won a gold medal in the two-woman event at the 2004 FIBT World Championships in Königssee.

Bader also finished eighth in the two-woman event at the 2002 Winter Olympics in Salt Lake City while competing for Russia. She then emigrated to Germany, sitting out the 2002–2003 World Cup season before being allowed to compete.

References
2002 bobsleigh two-woman results
Bobsleigh two-woman world championship medalists since 2000
FIBT profile

1981 births
Bobsledders at the 2002 Winter Olympics
German female bobsledders
Living people
Russian female bobsledders
Olympic bobsledders of Russia